Some people named Kahane include:

 Anetta Kahane, German journalist
 Binyamin Kahane, Israeli Air Force pilot, recipient of Medal of Courage 
 Rabbi Binyamin Ze'ev Kahane, founder of the Israeli Kahane Chai party; son of Rabbi Meir Kahane
 Brianna Kahane (born 2002), American child prodigy violinist 
 Gabriel Kahane, American composer, pianist and singer-songwriter
 Howard Kahane, professor of philosophy known for promoting a popular approach to logic
 Jack Kahane (1887–1939), Manchester-born writer and publisher
 Jackie Kahane, Polish-Canadian stand up comedian.
 Jean-Pierre Kahane (1926–2017), French mathematician
 Jeffrey Kahane, American pianist and conductor
 Rabbi Meir Kahane, founder of the American Jewish Defense League and the Israeli Kach party
 Rabbi Nachman Kahane, rabbinic scholar involved in renewal of Sanhedrin; author of commentary on Tosafot of the Talmud; brother of Rabbi Meir Kahane

See also 
 Cohen (surname)
 Kohen, a direct male descendant of the Biblical Aaron, brother of Moses
 Cohen (disambiguation)
 Coen (disambiguation)
 Cohn
 Kahana (disambiguation)

Kohenitic surnames